General elections were held in the Central African Republic on 27 December 2020 to elect the President and National Assembly. A second round of the legislative elections was originally scheduled to take place on 14 February 2021.

Voting was not able to take place in many areas of the country that are controlled by armed groups resulting in some Central African media and opposition candidates describing the elections as a farce and fraud. Some 800 of the country's polling stations, 14% of the total, were closed due to violence. During the first round, voting did not take place in 29 of 71 sub-prefectures, while in six others only a partial vote took place before being shut down due to voter intimidation.

Incumbent president Faustin-Archange Touadéra was re-elected with 53% of the vote. Turnout was 35% of registered voters.

On 13 February 2021 Touadéra announced a second round of elections in some areas and a new first round in areas that were controlled by rebels during the December elections. Respective elections for all areas will be held on March 14.

Background 
The previous presidential elections were the first to be held under the 2015 constitution, which established the 6th Republic.  Faustin-Archange Touadéra won the elections, and took office on 30 March 2016.

Several obstacles affected the election process. The December 2020 election took place during the Covid-19 pandemic, prompting fears of possible postponement. However, the constitution prohibits any further extension of the term of the incumbent president beyond his term of office, which for Touadéra is 29 March 2021. The government attempted to amend the constitution, but the draft was rejected by the Constitutional Court on 5 June 2020.  In addition, the country is also still subject to a UN peacekeeping operation, MINUSCA, while two-thirds of the country is controlled by rebellious armed groups.

In early September, the Constitutional Court gave the National Elections Authority (ANE) until 27 September to publish an updated voter registry.  On 10 September, the opposition and several civil society groups publicly observed that the election would probably be delayed; in the event that the presidential and parliamentary terms would be extended, they demanded the formation of a unity government.  For its part, the ANE announced that the registration of voters would be delayed until 8 October due to technical issues, but that the vote would not be postponed. The first round remained set for 27 December 2020 by the ANE.

Electoral system 
The President of the Central African Republic is elected by a two-round system for a five-year term, renewable only once. The candidate who receives an absolute majority of the votes cast in the first ballot is elected. If no majority is secured, a runoff is held between the top two candidates to decide the winner.

Presidential candidates
On 3 December 2020, the Constitutional Court of Central African Republic accepted 17 candidatures for presidential elections:
 Faustin-Archange Touadéra (MCU)
 Anicet-Georges Dologuélé (URCA)
 Martin Ziguélé (MLPC)
 Sylvain Patassé
 Mahamat Kamoun
 Augustin Agou
 Crépin Mboli Goumba (fr)
 Serge Djorie
 Eloi Anguimaté (fr)
 Alexandre-Ferdinand Nguendet
 Abdoul Karim Meckassoua
 Catherine Samba-Panza
 Cyriaque Gonda
 Nicolas Tiangaye
 Kolingba Désiré
 Reboas Aristide
 Serge Bokassa
Five candidatures were rejected, including that of former president François Bozizé. He had announced his candidacy on 25 July 2020.

Conduct
The rebel group Return, Reclamation, Rehabilitation banned voter registration for the elections in Koui and Ngaoundaye.

On 6 August 2020 UPC banned voter registration from taking in place in Bambouti in Haut-Mbomou demanding ransom. As of 15 October only 700 people were able to register to vote in Haut-Mbomou prefecture as a result of UPC and LRA presence in region.

The leaders of Return, Reclamation, Rehabilitation announced a coalition for the general election, a move that increased tensions ahead of the election, where the opposition feared massive voter fraud. The armed groups named themselves the Coalition of Patriots for Change (CPC) and invited other armed groups to join, while urging them to protect the integrity of civilians.  Their aim was to pressure the government into postponing the elections.  The coalition fought against MINUSCA peacekeepers as well as Russian and Rwandan troops until a ceasefire was declared on 23 December.

On 25 December, two days before the elections, unidentified armed gunmen attacked national security forces and international peacekeepers serving with the UN peacekeeping mission in the Central African Republic in Dékoa, central Kémo Prefecture, and Bakouma, southern Mbomou Prefecture. Three Burundian peacekeepers were killed and an additional two were wounded. The attack occurred hours after a rebel coalition fighting the government called off a unilateral truce and reiterated calls for the suspension of the election.

The attacks on the peacekeepers followed a general surge in violence across the Central African Republic, over the past few weeks, during which aid workers and properties have also been attacked. The insecurity and fear of violence has led to more than 55,000 people fleeing their homes.

During the first round, voting was unable to take place in 29 of the 71 sub-prefectures according to Augustin Yangana-Yahote, the Minister for Territorial Administration. Six others only managed to partially vote before being shut down due to voter intimidation.

Observers noted possible irregularities in the conduct of the election. An observer group reported that a large number of voters cast ballots with letters of exemption in Bangui.  The procedure allows voters to cast their ballot elsewhere than the polling station where they are registered. According to the Rainbow Network, 81 percent of the votes were cast in this manner. Coordinating member of the same network, Origine Bekondi said,  "Three days before the end of the mandate of the members of the ANE (the National Elections Authority), the president of the ANE proceeded to issue deregistration certificates to voters who had voted massively."

Results
According to provisional results announced on 4 January by the National Elections Authority, Faustin-Archange Touadéra was re-elected for a second term with 53.92 percent of the vote. Anicet-Georges Dologuélé came second. Turnout among registered voters was 76.3%.

On 18 January, the Constitutional Court confirmed President Faustin Archange Touadera's victory with 53.16% of the vote but said turnout was 35.25%. Anicet Georges Dologuele had 21.69%. The court rejected a suit filed by 13 of the 16 other candidates, who argued that Touadera's victory was the result of "massive fraud" and insecurity. They annulled or revised the results from certain polling stations because of irregularities but said the impact could not have affected the overall outcome. Chief Judge Danièle Darlan declared, "Part of the Central African people, who are at war, were prevented by acts of terror... and despite this, the people sent a strong and clear message to those who were terrorising them, to those who were telling them not to vote, and to the whole world."

A coalition opposition political party, COD 2020, accused the U.N.'s representative, Mankeur Ndiaye, of favouring Touadera but did not present evidence. The streets of Bangui were far quieter than usual, and many people said they feared rebel attacks. Rebels had attacked a location on the city's outskirts before being pushed back on 13 January. Since December 2020, 60,000 people have fled the violence, many seeking refuge in the Democratic Republic of Congo.

President

National Assembly

Reactions and aftermath
Former president Bozizé, who had been barred from running, was put under investigation after the results were announced; he was accused of aiding the armed coalitions that attempted to disrupt the election. His location was unknown in early January, amid accusations by the UN that he was colluding with the rebels.

After the publication of the results, Dologuele told AFP that the electoral process was a farce. According to local journalist Fridolin Ngoulou, however, Mr Touadéra's victory was likely to prove lasting. Ngoulou commented: "Touadéra's vote was the expression of people fed up with armed groups who want to impose a setback for democracy. Touadéra will retain power as the entire international community supports these elections."

Fighting between rebel groups and the CAR's national army has continued around the country since the election. The rebels declared an intent to take the war to Bangui, but a combination of the army, UN peacekeepers and Russian troops have prevented them from doing so.

References

Central Africa
General election
Central Africa
General election
December 2020 events in Africa
Election and referendum articles with incomplete results
Elections in the Central African Republic
February 2020 events in Africa
Presidential elections in the Central African Republic